Jordi Masó may refer to:

 Jordi Masó (pianist), Spanish classical pianist
 Jordi Masó (footballer) (born 1992), Spanish footballer